Pogonus luridipennis   or Yellow Pogonus is a small ground beetle found in sandy salt marshes.

References

Trechinae
Beetles described in 1823